Kossuth and its variations—Kossut, Kosuth, Košút, etc.—are surnames of Slavic origin. The literal meaning is "a hornless forest animal", most commonly a female (doe) deer or roe deer. Ko- is a prefix that provides emphasis to the root šutý, meaning "hornless".

In Slovak, košuta or košút can also mean "a castrated goat", "a somersault", or, in dialect, "a bossy person". 

Notable people with this surname include

 Ferenc Kossuth (1841–1914), Hungarian civil engineer and politician
 Lajos Kossuth (1802–1894), Hungarian lawyer, journalist, politician, and Governor-President of Hungary in 1849
 Małgorzata Kossut, Polish neuroscientist
 Joseph Kosuth (born 1945), American conceptual artist
 Juraj Košút (1776–1849), Slovak nobleman and lawyer from the Kingdom of Hungary who supported the Slovak national movement
 Marek Košút, Slovak football striker 
 Tomáš Košút (born 1990), Slovak football defender

References

Surnames of Slavic origin